Gymnastics events at the 1997 Games of the Small States of Europe were held in Reykjavík, Iceland.

Medalists

Artistic gymnastics

Men

Women

References

1997 in gymnastics
Games of the Small States of Europe
Gymnastics at the Games of the Small States of Europe
International gymnastics competitions hosted by Iceland